Wilbur T. and Rhoda Stephens Johnson House, also known as the Missouri State DAR Headquarters and Roslyn Heights, is a historic home located at Boonville, Cooper County, Missouri. It was built in 1895, and is a three-story, Queen Anne style red brick and limestone dwelling with elements of the Richardsonian Romanesque. It has a full basement, a porte cochere, and a full-length front entrance porch.  It features projecting porches, turrets and bays, a circular tower, and terra cotta panels. It was purchased by the Missouri State Society of the Daughters of the American Revolution for their state headquarters in 1983.

It was listed on the National Register of Historic Places in 1990.

References

Houses on the National Register of Historic Places in Missouri
Queen Anne architecture in Missouri
Richardsonian Romanesque architecture in Missouri
Houses completed in 1895
Houses in Cooper County, Missouri
National Register of Historic Places in Cooper County, Missouri
1895 establishments in Missouri
Daughters of the American Revolution
Boonville, Missouri